Galomecalpa hydrochoa is a species of moth of the family Tortricidae. It is found in Ecuador (Morona-Santiago Province, Napo Province and Chimborazo Province) and Peru.

References

Moths described in 1930
Euliini